Kondratyuk or Kondratiuk may refer to:

Astronomy
 Kondratyuk (crater), a lunar crater
 3084 Kondratyuk, a main-belt asteroid

People
 Adrian Kondratiuk (born 1993), Polish handball player
 Andrzej Kondratiuk (1936–2016), Polish film director
 Bohdan Kondratyuk (born 1987), Ukrainian footballer
 Janusz Kondratiuk (1943–2019), Polish film director
 Mark Kondratiuk (born 2003), Russian figure skater
 Mykola Kondratyuk (1931–2006), Ukrainian singer
 Oleksandr Kondratyuk (born 1983), Ukrainian futsal player
 Olena Kondratiuk (born 1970), Ukrainian politician
 Petro Kondratyuk (born 1979), Ukrainian footballer
 Yuri Kondratyuk (1897–1942), Ukrainian scientist and pioneer of astronautics and spaceflight

See also
 
 

Ukrainian-language surnames